Resplendent Mountain, or Mount Resplendent is a peak in the Canadian Rockies, located within Mount Robson Provincial Park in British Columbia, Canada.  It is a part of the Rainbow Range, and is a sister peak to the more famous Mount Robson, its nearest neighbour. Together they form a classic panorama seen by travellers from the VIA railway and Highway 16.    The mountain was named by Arthur P. Coleman, and A.O. Wheeler wrote, "On the east side it is clad from top to bottom in pure white snow, and presents with the sun shining upon it a spectacle of such wonderful brilliance that the aptness of the name became immediately apparent." The first ascent was achieved on the same historic 1911 trip in which Conrad Kain first scouted the climbing routes later to be used on the first ascent of Mount Robson.

The east face of Resplendent towers above the sources of Resplendent Creek, feeding into the Moose River, and its north face emerges from the Robson Glacier, feeding the Robson River, another tributary of the upper headwaters of the Fraser River.   Resplendent holds an important place in the history of Canadian Rockies ski mountaineering, and from the time of Peter L. Parson's first ski ascent (solo) in 1930, it has been a highly sought objective for winter ascents, with a ski descent of over 1800m from the summit to the toe of the Robson Glacier.

References 

 “A Winter Ascent of Mt. Resplendent”, Canadian Alpine Journal, 1931, Alpine Club of Canada, E. R. Gibson, p 102.

External links 
 Image of summit, Byron Harmon, c.1913, University of Alberta Library
 Conrad Kain website: http://www.conradkain.com/about

Canadian Rockies
Three-thousanders of British Columbia
Regional District of Fraser-Fort George
Cariboo Land District